Fredericksburg (also, Frederickburg and ) is an unincorporated community in Alpine County, California.

The town developed in the 1860s. A post office operated at Fredericksburg from 1898 to 1911.

Name
The town was started in 1864 and may have been named for Frederick Frevert, who operated a sawmill nearby.

References

External links

Unincorporated communities in California
Unincorporated communities in Alpine County, California